The Republic of the Marshall Islands has established bilateral diplomatic relations with about 105 states. Regional cooperation, through membership in various regional and international organizations, is a key element in its foreign policy.

The Marshall Islands became a member of the United Nations on September 17, 1991. The Marshall Islands maintains embassies in the United States, Fiji, South Korea, Japan, and the Republic of China (Taiwan). They also maintain a consulate in Honolulu, Hawaii and in Springdale, Arkansas, United States.

In May 2005, Chen Shui-bian, President of the Republic of China (Taiwan), became the first foreign head of state to make an official visit to the Marshall Islands.

Countries with diplomatic relations

List of countries with diplomatic relations with the Marshall Islands:

Bilateral relations

Human rights criticisms
Hong Kong national security law
In June 2020, the Marshall Islands openly opposed the Hong Kong national security law

See also
 Compact of Free Association
 List of diplomatic missions in the Marshall Islands
 List of diplomatic missions of the Marshall Islands
 Trust Territory of the Pacific Islands

References

External links
 Permanent Mission of the Republic of the Marshall Islands to the United Nations
RMI Embassy to the U.S. 
US Embassy in Majuro

 
Government of the Marshall Islands